Dhanya Manikya was the Maharaja of Tripura who reigned from 1490 to 1515 C.E. In this time, Tripura Sundari Temple was established.

Biography 
Assisted by his generals Ray Kachag and Ray Kacham, Dhanya Manikya expanded Tripura's territorial domain well into Eastern Bengal establishing control over entire Comilla district and parts of Sylhet, Noakhali and Chittagong districts of Bangladesh.

Dhanya Manikya set up many temples the foremost among which is the Tripura Sundari Temple in Udaipur. Before his death from smallpox in the year 1515 Dhanya had consolidated the kingdom through military prowess.

See also
Manikya dynasty
Tripura (princely state)

References

External links
Kingdom of Tripura - University of Queensland

Kings of Tripura
History of Tripura